An Executive Committee was the title of a three-person committee which served as the executive Branch of the Provisional Government of Oregon in the disputed Oregon Country. This arrangement was announced on July 5, 1843, after three months of study by the Provisional Legislature at Champoeg.

Powers
The executive committee was empowered to grant reprieves and pardons, recommend legislation, and call out the militia.

Members of the First Executive Committee (1843–1844)
David Hill – Pioneer from Connecticut, went on to become founder of Hillsboro, Oregon.
Alanson Beers – Also from Connecticut. Methodist missionary with the Reverend Jason Lee's mission. Later a business partner of George Abernethy.
Joseph Gale – Ship builder, sea captain and accomplished trader.

Members of the Second Executive Committee (1844–1845)
Peter G. Stewart – New York pioneer.
Osborne Russell – Helped build Fort Hall in Idaho, fur trader, later candidate for Provisional Governor.
William J. Bailey – Trapper and trader, later became a doctor.

Further reading
Klooster, Karl. Round the Roses II: More Past Portland Perspectives, p. 94, Portland, 1992.

References

Provisional Government of Oregon
Champoeg Meetings
State executive councils of the United States
1843 establishments in Oregon Country
Pardons